Kowdeh or Kudeh may refer to:
 Kudeh, Gilan
 Kowdeh, Razavi Khorasan